Bashi-Bazouk (possibly titled Bachi-Bouzouk nègre) is a painting by French artist Jean-Léon Gérôme. Done in oil on canvas, the painting depicts a Bashi-bazouk, an irregular soldier of the Ottoman Empire. The painting is currently on display at the Metropolitan Museum of Art.

Description
Painted by Jean-Léon Gérôme between 1868 and 1869, the painting depicts a dark-skinned model dressed as a Bashi-bazouk, a levy of irregular Ottoman soldiers infamous for their brutality, looting, and lack of discipline. Gérôme acquired the garb seen in the painting during a trip to the near east in 1868. The haphazard and mixed textiles the model is dressed in is reminiscent of the Bashi-bazouks, as the soldiers were traditionally unpaid and did not adopt a standardized uniform, resulting in the soldiers wearing whatever they could acquire on a march. This a key point of the painting, as the brutal reputation of a Bashi-bazouk is contrasted by the silk tunic, quality clothes, and noble bearing of the subject.

References

Paintings in the collection of the Metropolitan Museum of Art
1869 paintings
Paintings by Jean-Léon Gérôme